Béatrice Massin is a leading specialist in Baroque dance. Her choreographic writing confronts Baroque style with contemporary dance. She's the director of the company Fêtes galantes.
 
The daughter of musicologists Jean and Brigitte Massin, Béatrice Massin began her career with contemporary dance. In particular, she was a performer of shows by American . She met  in 1983 and joined the Ris and Danceries troupe of which she was successively interpreter, assistant, collaborator and choreographer. Then began a long process of appropriation of the baroque language.
 
In 1993, she founded the company Fêtes galantes. Since then, Béatrice Massin has deepened this approach in her creations. (Songes, Que ma joie demeure,). She received commissions (Le roi danse, film by Gérard Corbiau) and developed an educational centre within the Atelier baroque.

Choreographies 
 2012: Terpsichore (Rebel, Haendel) with the  ensemble Les Talens Lyriques, under the direction of Christophe Rousset
 2012: Fantaisies (Marais/Lully, Courbois, Nougaro/Vivaldi, Bach)
 2011: recréation des chorégraphies de Francine Lancelot pour l'opéra Atys by Lully
 2011: La Belle Dame (Lully, Rameau, Rebel)
 2009: Songes (Lully, Vivaldi, Charpentier, Purcell)
 2007: Un air de folies (Marais, Lambert, Guédron, Bataille, Boësset)
 2006: Un voyage d'hiver (Schubert)
 2004: Le Loup et l'Agneau, in Fables à la Fontaine de La Petite Fabrique
 2004: La Parade baroque, on the occasion of the inauguration of the Centre national de la danse
 2002: Que ma joie demeure (Bach)
 1999: choreography for the feature film Le roi danse by Gérard Corbiau

References

External links 
 Official site
 Herz und Mund und Tat und Leben, BWV 147 on YouTube
 La Belle au bois dormant at Théâtre National de Chaillot 
 Mass B by Béatrice Massin at Théâtre National de Chaillot
 Béatrice Massin / Compagnie Fêtes galantes

French female dancers
French choreographers
Historical dance
Year of birth missing (living people)
Living people